The Nouveau Roman ("new novel") is a type of 1950s French novel that diverged from classical literary genres. Émile Henriot coined the term in an article in the popular French newspaper Le Monde on May 22, 1957 to describe certain writers who experimented with style in each novel, creating an essentially new style each time. Most of the founding authors were published by Les Éditions de Minuit with the strong support of Jérôme Lindon.

Overview
Alain Robbe-Grillet, an influential theorist as well as writer of the Nouveau Roman, published a series of essays on the nature and future of the novel which were later collected in Pour un Nouveau Roman. Rejecting many of the established features of the novel to date, Robbe-Grillet regarded many earlier novelists as old-fashioned in their focus on plot, action, narrative, ideas, and character. Instead, he put forward a theory of the novel as focused on objects: the ideal nouveau roman would be an individual version and vision of things, subordinating plot and character to the details of the world rather than enlisting the world in their service.

Despite the assertions of nouveauté, this vision of the novel can be construed as developing from earlier writers' suggestions and practice. Joris-Karl Huysmans, ninety years before, had suggested how the novel might be depersonalised; more recently, Franz Kafka had shown that conventional methods of depicting character were not essential; James Joyce had done the same for plot; and absurdist writers had engaged with some of the themes that preoccupied writers of the nouveau roman.

A group of writers dubbed Nouveaux Romanciers, "new novelists", appeared in the mid-1950s: Alain Robbe-Grillet, Claude Simon, Nathalie Sarraute, Michel Butor and Robert Pinget. The style had different approaches but generally rejected the traditional use of chronology, plot and character in fiction, as well as the omniscient narrator. The Nouveau Roman authors were open to influences from writers such as William Faulkner and the cinema. Both Robbe-Grillet and Marguerite Duras, whose 1958 novel Moderato cantabile was in the style of the Nouveau roman, also contributed to the French New Wave style of filmmaking.

Alain Robbe-Grillet became an elected member of the Académie française on 25 March 2004, succeeding Maurice Rheims at seat No. 32. Claude Simon, the 1985 Nobel laureate in Literature, is often identified with the nouveau roman movement. 

The nouveau roman literary movement and the novels themselves were mainly theorized by Jean Ricardou, who,  in addition to his well-known theoretical works — Problèmes du Nouveau Roman (1967), Pour une théorie du Nouveau Roman (1971), Le Nouveau Roman (1973), Nouveaux problèmes du roman (1978) — also published several nouveaux romans himself: L’Observatoire de Cannes (1961), La Prise de Constantinople (1965, Feneon prize for literature in 1966), Les Lieux-dits, petit guide d’un voyage dans le livre (1969). Besides his own writing, he organized, directed and published the acts of several conferences on the nouveau roman, including the famous 1971 conference and debate at Cerisy, published in two volumes: Nouveau roman : hier, aujourd’hui, indispensable for an understanding of the history of that important period of French literature. Just before his demise in 2016, he was working on a book of interviews with Amir Biglari, in which he provides a complete, precise and objective account of the nouveau roman movement.

Authors in the style of the Nouveau Roman

 Samuel Beckett
 Alain Robbe-Grillet
 Nathalie Sarraute
 Claude Simon
 Michel Butor
 Jean Ricardou
 Marguerite Duras
 Jean-Marie Gustave Le Clézio (until the 1970s)
 Philippe Sollers
 Jean Cayrol
 Robert Pinget

Other writers associated with the style of Nouveau Roman are:

 Gérard Bessette
 Maurice Blanchot 
 Italo Calvino
 Jean Cayrol
 Julio Cortázar
 Tony Duvert
 Jacques Godbout
 Maude Hutchins
 Claude Mauriac
 Claude Ollier
 Georges Perec

The Nouveau Roman and the Left Bank
The Nouveau Roman style also left its mark on the screen as writers Marguerite Duras and Alain Robbe-Grillet became involved with the Left Bank film movement (often labelled as part of the French New Wave). Their collaboration with director Alain Resnais resulted in critical successes such as Hiroshima mon amour (1958) and Last Year at Marienbad (1961). They would later go on to direct their own films.
Influenced by these films French courses in North America during the 1960s and 1970s often included works by Nouveau Roman authors such as Alain Robbe-Grillet's La Jalousie (1957), Michel Butor's La Modification (1957), Nathalie Sarraute's Le Planetarium (1957) and Marguerite Duras' Moderato Cantabile (1958).

The Nouveau Roman in Quebec, Canada
The Nouveau Roman influenced French-language writers in Quebec such as Jacques Godbout and Gerard Bessette. The Canadian-born French writer Nancy Huston declared that she began writing in direct reaction to the stark style of the Nouveau Roman in Nord Perdu (1999). (See Joseph Pivato, nouveau roman)

See also

 French literature
 Francophone literature
 List of French language authors
 Antinovel

References

Bibliography
 Bernard Luscans, La représentation des objets dans le nouveau nouveau roman, Chapel Hill, Université de Caroline du Nord, 2008. 
 Joseph Pivato, 'Nouveau Roman Canadien', Canadian Literature 58 (Autumn 1973) 51-60. [canlit.ca/article/nouveau-roman-canadien/]
 Joseph Pivato, 'Nancy Huston Meets le Nouveau Roman, Athabasca University Canadian Writers Site. [canadian-writers.athabascau.ca/english/writers/nhuston/nouveau_roman.php.php]

French literature
Literary genres